This is a list of all 125 railway stations in Lithuania, sorted alphabetically. All are served by LTG Link, with the exception of Šeštokai, which is served only by the Rail Baltica link to Poland.

Akmenė railway station
Alksnėnai railway station
Alvitas railway station
Bagotoji railway station
Baltamiškis railway station
Bebruliškė railway station
Bezdonys railway station
Būdviečiai railway station
Bygailiai railway station
Dituva railway station
Dūkštas railway station
Durpynas railway station
Dūseikiai railway station
Elektrinių Traukinių Depas-1 railway station
Elektrinių Traukinių Depas-2 railway station
Garliava railway station
Gerkonys railway station
Giruliai railway station
Gružeikiai railway station
Gustonys railway station
Ignalina railway station
Jašiūnai railway station
Jonava railway station
Juodšiliai railway station
Jūrė railway station
Kaišiadorys railway station
Kalviai railway station
Karčiupis railway station
Kariotiškės railway station
Karsakiškis railway station
Kaugonys railway station
Kaunas railway station
Kazlų Rūda railway station
Kėdainiai railway station
Kena railway station
Kirtimai railway station
Klaipėda railway station
Klepočiai railway station
Kretinga railway station
Kukorai railway station
Kūlupėnai railway station
Kupiškis railway station
Kuršėnai railway station
Kutiškiai railway station
Kužiai railway station
Kybartai railway station
Kyviškės railway station
Laba railway station
Labučiai railway station
Lazdėnai railway station
Lentvaris railway station
Lieplaukė railway station
Lobiniai railway station
Mankiškiai railway station
Marcinkonys railway station
Marijampolė railway station
Matuizos railway station
Mauručiai railway station
Mažeikiai railway station
Mickūnai railway station
Miškiniai railway station
Naujoji Vilnia railway station
Oro Uostas railway station
Pabališkiai railway station
Pabradė railway station
Pailgis railway station
Pakenė railway station
Pakretuonė railway station
Palemonas railway station
Pamerkiai railway station
Pamieris railway station
Panemunėlis railway station
Paneriai railway station
Panevėžys railway station
Papilė railway station
Parudaminys railway station
Pavenčiai railway station
Pavilnys railway station
Pažeimenė railway station
Pilviškiai railway station
Plungė railway station
Pravieniškės railway station
Priekulė railway station
Radviliškis railway station
Radžiūnai railway station
Raudėnai railway station
Rimkai railway station
Rokiškis railway station
Rūdiškės railway station
Rykantai railway station
Santaka railway station
Šateikiai railway station
Šeduva railway station
Senieji Trakai railway station
Šeštokai railway station
Šiauliai railway station
Šilėnai railway station
Šilutė railway station
Skapiškis railway station
Skersabaliai railway station
Šklėriai railway station
Sodai railway station
Subačius railway station
Švenčionėliai railway station
Tarvainiai railway station
Telšiai railway station
Terešiškės railway station
Tindžiuliai railway station
Trakai railway station
Tryškiai railway station
Turmantas railway station
Valčiūnai railway station
Valkininkai railway station
Varėna railway station
Viekšniai railway station
Vievis railway station
Vilkaviškis railway station
Vilkyčiai railway station
Vilnius railway station
Vilnius Airport Railway Station
Vinčai railway station
Visaginas railway station
Vokė railway station
Voveriškiai railway station
Žasliai railway station
Žeimena railway station

References

Railway stations in Lithuania
Railway stations
Railway stations
Lithuania